Simon Bokoté Banza (born 13 August 1996) is a French professional footballer who plays as a forward for Primeira Liga club S.C. Braga.

Formed at Lens, where he played 98 games and scored 16 goals including in Ligue 1 and Ligue 2, he went on to play in Portugal's Primeira Liga for Famalicão and Braga.

Club career

Lens
Born in Creil, Oise, Banza began his senior career with Lens, first with its reserve team in the fourth tier. He scored his first Ligue 2 goal on 6 May 2016, as consolation at the end of a 2–1 loss at Bourg-en-Bresse.

In January 2017, Banza was loaned to Championnat National club Béziers until the end of the season. That August, he moved to UT Pétange of the Luxembourg National Division in the same manner. He was the season's sixth highest scorer with 13 goals, including a hat-trick in a 4–1 home win over US Esch on 15 April 2018.

On 24 May 2019, Banza scored the extra-time winner as Lens won 2–1 at Troyes in the second leg of the play-off semi-finals. The following season, he scored seven times as Lens won promotion as runners-up, including two on 3 December 2019 in a 3–0 home win over his local side Chambly. He was sent off 18 days later in a 1–0 win over Niort also at the Stade Bollaert-Delelis.

Famalicão
On 31 August 2021, Banza joined Famalicão in Portugal on loan for the 2021–22 season. On his Primeira Liga debut 12 days later, he scored twice in a 2–2 draw at Moreirense; he added both goals of a win at Santa Clara on 23 October, though he was also sent off. He finished the season as joint seventh top scorer with 14 goals in 29 games, including two on the final day in a 3–2 home comeback win over neighbours Braga to ensure a top-half finish.

Braga
On 19 July 2022, Banza signed a five-year deal with Braga for a €3 million fee, complete with a buyout clause of €30 million. He made his debut on 7 August in the season opener at home to Sporting CP, scoring his club's first goal of a 3–3 draw; five days later he added two more goals in a 3–0 win on his return to Famalicão.

Personal life
Banza was born in France to DR Congolese parents.

Honours
Individual
Primeira Liga Forward of the Month: August 2022
Primeira Liga Player of the Month: August 2022

References

External links

1996 births
People from Creil
Sportspeople from Oise
Footballers from Hauts-de-France
Black French sportspeople
French sportspeople of Democratic Republic of the Congo descent
Living people
Association football forwards
French footballers
RC Lens players
AS Béziers (2007) players
Union Titus Pétange players
F.C. Famalicão players
S.C. Braga players
Ligue 1 players
Ligue 2 players
Championnat National players
Championnat National 2 players
Luxembourg National Division players
Primeira Liga players
French expatriate footballers
Expatriate footballers in Luxembourg
Expatriate footballers in Portugal
French expatriate sportspeople in Luxembourg
French expatriate sportspeople in Portugal